The Americas Zone is one of the three zones of regional Davis Cup competition in 2013.

In the Americas Zone there are three different groups in which teams compete against each other to advance to the next group.

Participating nations

Seeds:
 
 
 
 

Remaining nations:

Draw

 and  relegated to Group III in 2014.
 promoted to Group I in 2014.

First round

Puerto Rico vs. Mexico

El Salvador vs. Barbados

Venezuela vs. Guatemala

Peru vs. Haiti

Second round

El Salvador vs. Mexico

Peru vs. Venezuela

Play-offs

Barbados vs. Puerto Rico

Guatemala vs. Haiti

Third round

El Salvador vs. Venezuela

References

External links
Official Website

Americas Zone II
Davis Cup Americas Zone

it:Coppa Davis 2013 Zona Asia/Oceania Gruppo I
zh:2013年台維斯盃亞洲及大洋洲區第一級